Locust Hill is a historic home located near Mechanicsville in Rockbridge County, Virginia. The house was built in 1826, and is a two-story, three bay, Federal style brick dwelling.  It has a side gable roof and interior end chimneys.  The interior was damaged by fire in the 1850s and much of the woodwork was replaced with Greek Revival forms. A Greek Revival style front porch dates from the same period. The property also includes the contributing "slave quarters," a double pen log corn crib, and two frame sheds.

It was listed on the National Register of Historic Places in 1986.

References

Houses on the National Register of Historic Places in Virginia
Federal architecture in Virginia
Greek Revival houses in Virginia
Houses completed in 1826
Houses in Rockbridge County, Virginia
National Register of Historic Places in Rockbridge County, Virginia
1826 establishments in Virginia
Slave cabins and quarters in the United States